Paul Benedict Lordon (January 24, 1915 – November 9, 1992) was a Canadian politician. He served in the Legislative Assembly of New Brunswick from 1960 to 1961 as member of the Liberal party.
Lordon was a lawyer, maintaining a practice in the town of Chatham, NB for many years. He was a longtime solicitor for the town. He died in 1992 after crashing his vehicle into a utility pole.

References

1915 births
1992 deaths
20th-century Canadian politicians
New Brunswick Liberal Association MLAs
People from Bathurst, New Brunswick